Charles Einstein (August 2, 1926 – March 7, 2007) was a newspaperman and sportswriter. He was the author of the 1953 novel The Bloody Spur, on which the film While the City Sleeps (1956), directed by Fritz Lang, was based. Einstein's father was the comedian Harry Einstein. He was the older half-brother of comedic actors Albert Brooks and Bob Einstein, better known by his stage name "Super Dave Osborne".

Bibliography
The Bloody Spur, Dell First Edition #5, pbo, 1953. reprinted as While the City Sleeps (Dell D86, 1956).
Wiretap!, Dell First Edition #76, pbo, 1955.
The Only Game In Town, Dell First Edition 47, pbo, 1955 
The Last Laugh, Dell First Edition A121, pbo, 1956.
No Time at All, Simon & Schuster, hc, 1957. Dell, pb, 1958.
The Naked City, Stories based on TV scripts by Stirling Silliphant. Dell First Edition A180, pbo, 1959.
A Flag for San Francisco, Simon and Schuster, Inc, 1962, J. Lowell Pratt and Company, pb, 1963
 “And a Merry Christmas to the Force on Patrol”
 “Lady Bug, Lady Bug…”
 Line of Duty
 Meridian
 Nickel Ride
 The Other Face of Goodness
 Susquehanna 7-8367
 The Violent Circle
The Day New York Went Dry, Fawcett Gold Medal, 1967.
The Blackjack Hijack, Random House, 1976. Fawcett Crest, pb, 1976.
Willie's Time, Southern Illinois University Press, 1979.

Einstein was also the editor of a series of compilations of baseball writings, titled The Fireside Book of Baseball.

References

External links
 Blog post.
 Interview with Einstein on the occasion of the republication of his 1979 biography of Willie Mays.

American male novelists
1926 births
2007 deaths
American male journalists
20th-century American journalists
20th-century American novelists
20th-century American male writers
20th-century American non-fiction writers
Writers from Boston